Abdulov (masculine) or Abdulova (feminine) is a Russian, Azerbaijani, and Central Asian surname, a variant of Abdulayev. It is shared by the following people:
Aleksandr Abdulov (1953–2008), Russian actor
Darya Abdulova, Russian pair skater at the 2009 Russian Figure Skating Championships
Ilgar Abdulov (born 1981), Azerbaijani Greco-Roman wrestler
Olim Abdulov, journalist killed in Tajikistan
Osip Abdulov (1900–1953), Russian actor
Samir Abdulov (born 1987), Azerbaijani footballer
Vsevolod Abdulov, actor from The Trust That Has Burst, 1984 Soviet miniseries

See also
Abdulovo, several rural localities in Russia
Abdullovo, a rural locality (a selo) in Ulyanovsk Oblast, Russia

References

Notes

Sources
И. М. Ганжина (I. M. Ganzhina). "Словарь современных русских фамилий" (Dictionary of Modern Russian Last Names). Москва, 2001. 

Azerbaijani-language surnames
Kazakh-language surnames
Kyrgyz-language surnames
Russian-language surnames
Tajik-language surnames
Turkmen-language surnames
Uzbek-language surnames
